Thomas Peter Maras (born 13 September 1967) is a retired Australian footballer. After retiring from the game he works as a registered builder and property developer in Perth.
Inducted into the Western Australian soccer hall of fame in 2008.

External links
Career Statistics at OzFootball

1967 births
Living people
Australian soccer players
Perth Glory FC players
Expatriate footballers in Malaysia
Happy Valley AA players
Expatriate footballers in Hong Kong
Association football goalkeepers